Gotzon Udondo Santamaria (born 1 December 1993) is a Spanish cyclist, who last rode for UCI Professional Continental team .

References

External links

1993 births
Living people
Spanish male cyclists
Cyclists from the Basque Country (autonomous community)
Sportspeople from Biscay
People from Greater Bilbao